Brad Agoos is an American former soccer player and the current head coach of USL League Two side Black Rock.

Playing career
After leaving the University of Virginia, where he had been named ACC Men's Soccer Tournament MVP in 1992, Agoos would embark on a journeyman career which took him to Germany, Costa Rica and the Netherlands.

He joined FC 08 Homburg in 1993, before returning to the United States with Major League Soccer side D.C. United. After playing one season in the Continental Indoor Soccer League with Carolina Vipers in 1994, Agoos played three consecutive seasons in the A-League with Charlotte Eagles, Charleston Battery and Worcester Wildfire.

In 1997, Agoos moved to Costa Rica to join Puntarenas. He also played for Santa Bárbara from 1997 to 1998.

He played for Vermont Voltage in 1999, while also serving as a coach, before moving to the Netherlands to sign with third-division side Quick Den Haag.

Coaching career
Agoos started his coaching career at youth club Park Sharon SC in the 1994–95 season. After this, he volunteered at the Charlotte 49ers in 1996, and the San Francisco Dons in 1998.

He took up his first full-time role in 2000, when he became assistant coach of the California Golden Bears at the University of California, Berkeley. In 2006, he was appointed head coach at the Seattle Redhawks, where he stayed for six seasons before being fired in 2011, following a bad run of results.

Between 2013 and 2015, he was a youth academy coach at the Portland Timbers. He then coached Crossfire Premier SC before taking up a position as assistant manager of the Norwich University men's soccer team.

Personal life
Agoos is the brother of former soccer player Jeff Agoos.

Career statistics

Club

Notes

References

Date of birth missing (living people)
Living people
Soccer players from Dallas
University of Virginia alumni
American soccer players
Association football defenders
Association football midfielders
Virginia Cavaliers men's soccer players
Continental Indoor Soccer League players
A-League (1995–2004) players
Carolina Vipers players
Boston Bulldogs (soccer) players
Year of birth missing (living people)
Seattle Redhawks men's soccer coaches